Chuck Hittinger (born February 12, 1983) is an American actor. He is known for playing Sean Ackard in Pretty Little Liars (2010–11), as Van Dyke Tosh in Jonas, and as Matt, the son of Ian Ziering's character, in the 2013 Syfy television movie Sharknado.

Filmography

References

External links
 

1983 births
American male film actors
American male television actors
21st-century American male actors
Living people